The Houston Astros' 1983 season was a season in American baseball. It involved the Houston Astros attempting to win the National League West.

Offseason 
 December 10, 1982: Danny Heep was traded by the Astros to the New York Mets for Mike Scott.
 January 11, 1983: Troy Afenir was drafted by the Astros in the 1st round (11th pick) of the 1983 Major League Baseball draft (Secondary Phase).
 March 31, 1983: Alan Knicely was traded by the Astros to the Cincinnati Reds for Bill Dawley and Tony Walker.

Regular season 
 April 17, 1983: Nolan Ryan struck out Andre Dawson for the 3500th strikeout in his career.
 April 27, 1983: Nolan Ryan struck out Brad Mills of the Expos to break Walter Johnson's all time mark for strikeouts in a career. Mills was the 3,509th strikeout of Ryan's career.

Season standings

Record vs. opponents

Notable transactions 
 June 6, 1983: Robbie Wine was drafted by the Astros in the 1st round (8th pick) of the 1983 Major League Baseball draft.
 June 17, 1983: Danny Boone was released by the Astros.

Roster

Player stats

Batting

Starters by position 
Note: Pos = Position; G = Games played; AB = At bats; H = Hits; Avg. = Batting average; HR = Home runs; RBI = Runs batted in

Other batters 
Note: G = Games played; AB = At bats; H = Hits; Avg. = Batting average; HR = Home runs; RBI = Runs batted in

Pitching

Starting pitchers 
Note: G = Games pitched; IP = Innings pitched; W = Wins; L = Losses; ERA = Earned run average; SO = Strikeouts

Other pitchers 
Note: G = Games pitched; IP = Innings pitched; W = Wins; L = Losses; ERA = Earned run average; SO = Strikeouts

Relief pitchers 
Note: G = Games pitched; W = Wins; L = Losses; SV = Saves; ERA = Earned run average; SO = Strikeouts

Awards and honors 
Ray Knight, Hutch Award

Farm system

References

External links
1983 Houston Astros season at Baseball Reference

Houston Astros seasons
1983 Major League Baseball season
Houston